Kelly-Louise Pesticcio, from Cardiff, Wales, won the title of Miss Wales 2007 and went on to represent Wales in the 2007 Miss World competition, held in Sanya, China, where she finished as third runner-up in the Miss Sports Fast Track. Pesticcio, a qualified doctor, was also a finalist in the 2010 Miss Universe Great Britain pageant 
She is of Italian origin.

References

Miss World 2007 delegates
1984 births
Living people
Medical doctors from Cardiff
Welsh beauty pageant winners